Borgie is a hamlet in Sutherland, Highland, Scotland. Historically it was part of the  Tongue estate with shooting rights, and it contains the Borgie Lodge, now a bed and breakfast. Borgie is noted for its salmon, which are caught in the River Borgie which flows to the east of the hamlet.

Geography
The River Borgie flows to the east of the hamlet. To the southeast of the hamlet are the streams Allt Borgidh Beag and Allt an Ruigh Ruaidh, tributaries of the Borgie near the A836 road.

The hamlet features an area known as Borgie Wood or The Millennium Forest. The forest area was established under the Millennium Forest for Scotland project, which looked to develop natural areas for the turn of the New Millennium.

Landmarks

The hamlet contains the Borgie Lodge Hotel, a bed and breakfast with eight bedrooms, which was a hunting lodge during the Victorian period.  The lodge has stag antlers on display, log fires and Sutherland tartan carpets, and contains the Naver Lounge restaurant. There is a small bridge over the River Borgie, Borgie Bridge.

References

Populated places in Sutherland